The 1922 BYU Cougars football team was an American football team that represented Brigham Young University (BYU) as a member of the Rocky Mountain Conference (RMC) during the 1922 college football season. It was the first team to represent BYU in intercollegiate football. The Cougars compiled an overall record of 1–5 record with an identical mark in conference play, finished eighth in the RMC, suffered shutouts in four of six games, and were outscored by a total of 184 to 10.

Schedule

Notable firsts
On October 7, 1922, in the opening game of the season, right end Nelson drop-kicked a field goal from the 25-yard line for three points – the first points scored in BYU program history.

The team won the first victory in program history by a 7–0 score against Wyoming on November 14, 1922. The first touchdown in program history was scored on a pass from captain and left halfback Paul Packard to fullback Hunter Manson who then ran 25 yards to score.

Personnel
Alvin Twitchell was the head coach. Twitchell was a graduate of Utah Agricultural College where he played both basketball and football. Before being hired at BYU (initially as the basketball coach), he coached basketball and football at Monroe High School and Brigham City's Box Elder High School.

During the summer of 1922, Twitchell traveled to the University of Illinois for training in football strategy and technique. He returned to Provo in late August to assemble and train the school's first intercollegiate football team.

The players on the first BYU football team included Bernardino Bowman (LG), Merrill Bunnell (RE), Royal Chamberlain (LH), Buck Dixon (LE), Boney Fuller (QB), Victor Hatch (RT), Elwood Jackson (LG), Keith Maeser (RG), Hunter Manson (FB), Lynn Miller (LE), Frank Morgan (RH), Paul Packard (LH), Truman Partridge (RG), Bowman (LG), Gledhill (C), Fulier (QB),  and Ike Young (LT).

References

BYU
BYU Cougars football seasons
BYU Cougars football